Gilbert Warren "Gil" Ferguson (April 22, 1923 – May 6, 2007) was an American marine, businessman and politician.

Born in St. Louis, Missouri, Ferguson served as a Lieutenant Colonel in the United States Marine Corps during World War II, the Korean War, and the Vietnam War. Ferguson went to University of Southern California. He also studied at the University of Akron. He was a Vice President for the Irvine Company in the advertising and public relations business and lived in Newport Beach, California. From 1982 to 1992, Ferguson served in the California State Assembly and was a Republican. During his tenure in the California Assembly, he advocated for less government and more individual competition for housing and medical access, and private responsibility in environmental issues, notably championing "high occupancy vehicle" traffic lanes and responsible land use. Ferguson supported considerable racial diversity. In August 1990 Lt Col(Ret) Ferguson introduced a resolution that states "it is simply untrue that Japanese-Americans were interned in concentration camps during World War II."

Military service
Fergusen joined the Marines and served at Tarawa during World War II, where he received the Purple Heart. He also served in Korea during the Korean War and Vietnam during the Vietnam War.

References

External links

Join California Gil Ferguson

1923 births
2007 deaths
Politicians from St. Louis
People from Newport Beach, California
University of Akron alumni
University of Southern California alumni
Businesspeople from California
United States Marine Corps personnel of the Korean War
United States Marine Corps personnel of the Vietnam War
United States Marine Corps personnel of World War II
Republican Party members of the California State Assembly
United States Marine Corps officers
20th-century American politicians
20th-century American businesspeople
Military personnel from California